Asian Highway 65 (AH65) is a road in the Asian Highway Network running  from Kashgar, Xinjiang, China to Termez, Uzbekistan. The route Irkeshtam–Termez is also numbered European route E60.
The route is as follows:

China
 : Kashgar - Kuquwan
 : Kuquwan - junction with G3013
 : junction with G3013 - Ulugqat
 : Ulugqat - Erkeshtam

Kyrgyzstan
  ЭМ-05 Road:Irkeshtam - Sary-Tash 
(Branch)  ЭМ-05 Road:  Sary-Tash - Osh
  ЭМ-06 Road: Sary-Tash - Karamyk

Tajikistan
  РБ07 Road : Karamyk - Vahdat 
  РБ04 Road : Vahdat  - Dushanbe - Tursunzada
  РБ02 Road : Dushanbe - Tursunzada

Uzbekistan
Denau - Termez

Asian Highway Network
Roads in Kyrgyzstan
Roads in Uzbekistan
Roads in Tajikistan
Roads in China
Roads in Xinjiang